Tom Dronkert (born 3 December 1944) is a Dutch rower. He competed in the men's coxed four event at the 1968 Summer Olympics.

References

1944 births
Living people
Dutch male rowers
Olympic rowers of the Netherlands
Rowers at the 1968 Summer Olympics
Sportspeople from Dordrecht